Quest (initially titled Q for Quest) is a Canadian entertainment and information anthology television series which aired on CBC Television from 1961 to 1964.

Premise
The series began in January 1961 as Q for Quest and featured a variety of documentaries, dramas and musical performances. The series was hosted by Andrew Allan for its first six months. Executive producer Ross McLean described the series as "a free-form exercise in the inventive use of television."

After the initial season ended in June 1961, McLean left CBC for the upstart private CTV Television Network and was replaced by Daryl Duke. Allan was replaced as host by Robert Whitehead. The series title was shortened to Quest when it began its first full season in October 1961. Episode producers included Harvey Hart, George McCowan, Mario Prizek and Whitehead.

In March 1964, Duke left the CBC to work with Steve Allen in the United States after completing an episode featuring musician Bob Dylan for Quest. That final episode of Quest was broadcast on 10 March 1964. CBC created a new experimental anthology series Eye Opener which aired from January to March 1965.

Reception

Quest took an experimental and often controversial approach on the  productions it aired. The presentation of Jules Feiffer's satirical play Crawling Arnold on the 4 February 1962 episode drew particularly strong public reaction. Edwin William Brunsden, a Member of Parliament, received negative correspondence to this broadcast and denounced the episode in Parliament as "depraved... disgusting... garbage... and a rank violation of the sanctity of the Canadian home and family." The suitability of Quest'''s subject matter for a broadcast audience was also a concern of CBC management on occasion. (House of Commons report) Ottawa-based Sock 'n' Buskin Theatre Company lodged a different complaint regarding the CBC's promotion of "Crawling Arnold" as a "North American premiere" because the theatre group began its performances of the play three days prior to the broadcast.

Alberta Member of Parliament Clifford Smallwood declared to the 25 February 1964 broadcast of "For Want of Something Better to Do" to be "corrupt and immoral". Smallwood demanded that CBC programming be approved by a House of Commons committee. Ottawa Citizen columnist Frank Penn saw little immorality in that episode, but rather that the play was a challenge to inhumanity.

CBC had received more critical letters from viewers for Quest than for any other program according to Duke during a September 1962 interview.

Episodes

Weeks not listed were usually pre-empted by other programming such as extended editions of Close-Up, CBC Newsmagazine or Stanley Cup playoffs.

Season 1: early 1961Q for Quest began as a mid-season series, airing Tuesdays at 10:30 p.m. (Eastern).

The initial 1961 half-season was pre-empted by extended hour-long editions of Close-Up on 31 January, 7 March, 25 April. Stanley Cup playoff broadcasts also pre-empted Q for Quest on 21 March and 4 April 1961. The 2 May episode was pre-empted by the special documentary University.

Season 2: 1961–1962
The first full season of Quest aired on Sundays at 10:30 p.m. (Eastern).

Season 3: 1962–1963Quest retained its Sunday 10:30 p.m. (Eastern) time slot for its 1962–63 season.

Season 4: 1963–1964
The final season of Quest'' returned to its original Tuesday 10:30 p.m. time slot.

References

External links

CBC Television original programming
1961 Canadian television series debuts
1964 Canadian television series endings